Bdellophaga is a monotypic genus of gylippid camel spiders, first described by Robert Wharton in 1981. Its single species, Bdellophaga angulata is distributed in Namibia.

References 

Solifugae
Arachnid genera
Monotypic arachnid genera